JetSmart Airlines Perú S.A.C., styled as JetSMART, is a Peruvian airline owned by the Chilean ultra low-cost carrier JetSmart, itself owned by Indigo Partners. Its primary base of operations is Jorge Chávez International Airport, servicing Lima, Peru; and has a secondary base at Rodríguez Ballón International Airport, in Arequipa, Peru.

Destinations
JetSmart Perú operates to the following destinations:

Fleet
The JetSmart Perú fleet consists of the following aircraft:

See also
List of airlines of Peru

References

External links
Official website

Airlines established in 2021
Airlines of Peru
Low-cost carriers